Eupatorium rotundifolium, commonly called roundleaf thoroughwort, is a North American species of plant in the family Asteraceae. It native to the eastern and central United States, in all the coastal states from Maine to Texas, and inland as far as Missouri and the Ohio Valley. It is found in low, moist habitats such as wet savannas and bogs.

Description
The stems up to 100 cm (40 inches) tall and are produced from short rhizomes. The inflorescences are composed of a large number of small white flower heads, each with 5 disc florets but no ray florets. Plants can be highly variable due to hybridization.

Taxonomy
Three varieties of Eupatorium rotundifolium are recognized. They are:
Eupatorium rotundifolium var. ovatum (Bigelow) Torr.
Eupatorium rotundifolium var. rotundifolium 
Eupatorium rotundifolium var. scabridum (Elliott) A.Gray

The plants known as Eupatorium rotundifolium var. saundersii have often been treated as a variety of E. rotundifolium.  They can be distinguished based on morphology, and molecular evidence also suggests that these plants may be different enough from E. rotundifolium to recognize them as a species, Eupatorium pilosum.

Hybridization
As is common in Eupatorium, E. rotundifolium can form hybrids with other species in the genus.  In particular, Eupatorium godfreyanum is a hybrid of E. rotundifolium and Eupatorium sessilifolium.

Chemical constituents
Eupatorium rotundifolium contains sesquiterpene lactones of the guaianolide type including euparotin acetate and eupachlorin acetate, both of which inhibit tumor growth in vitro when isolated from the plant.

References

rotundifolium
Flora of the United States
Plants described in 1753
Taxa named by Carl Linnaeus